Vidal Ramos is a municipality in the state of Santa Catarina in the South region of Brazil.

History 
Vidal Ramos received city status by state law No. 272 in December 1956, with territory taken from the neighbouring municipality of Brusque.

It was named after the Governor of Santa Catarina of the same name.

Geography 
It is located at a latitude 27º23'31 "South and longitude 49º21'21" West, with an altitude of 370 meters. Its estimated population in 2020 was 6,329 inhabitants.

It has an area of 343.81 square kilometers.

See also
List of municipalities in Santa Catarina

References

Municipalities in Santa Catarina (state)